The 2016 Superliga Colombiana (known as the 2016 Superliga Águila for sponsorship purposes) was the fifth edition of the Superliga Colombiana. Atlético Nacional were the winners and qualified for the 2016 Copa Sudamericana.

Teams

Matches

First leg

Second leg

External links
Superliga at DIMAYOR

References

Superliga Colombiana
Superliga Colombiana 2016
Superliga Colombiana 2016
Superliga Colombiana
Superliga Colombiana